Cleveland is a city in Pawnee County, Oklahoma, United States. The 2010 census population was 3,251, a decrease of 0.9 percent from the figure of 3,282 recorded in 2000.

History
After the Cherokee Outlet opening, a homesteader by the name of Willis H. Herbert established a town named Herbert by opening a post office on the current townsite of Cleveland on October 28, 1893.  The Post Office department subsequently withdrew the approval of the Herbert post office.  The post office was then moved 100 feet, and reestablished under the name Cleveland, named in honor of then President Grover Cleveland on April 19, 1894.  By 1900, the town's population was 211. Before the discovery of oil in the area, the town served as a trade center between the local farmers and the Osage Tribe who lived on the reservation on the other side of the Arkansas river.

In 1904, a railroad line owned by the Missouri, Kansas and Oklahoma Railroad (later known as Missouri, Kansas and Texas Railway or Katy) from Oklahoma City reached Cleveland and crossed the Arkansas River into Osage County. On May 27, 1904, the first oil well was spudded near the community, and it caused an influx of  oil workers and other people. At the time of statehood in 1907, Cleveland had 1,441 residents.

Geography

Demographics

As of the census of 2000, there were 3,282 people, 1,322 households, and 913 families residing in the city. The population density was 1,264.1 people per square mile (487.4/km). There were 1,483 housing units at an average density of 571.2 per square mile (220.2/km). The racial makeup of the city was 85.19% White, 0.21% African American, 8.96% Native American, 0.46% Asian, 0.06% Pacific Islander, 0.34% from other races, and 4.78% from two or more races. Hispanic or Latino of any race were 1.04% of the population.

There were 1,322 households, out of which 30.9% had children under the age of 18 living with them, 54.2% were married couples living together, 10.2% had a female householder with no husband present, and 30.9% were non-families. 28.7% of all households were made up of individuals, and 16.6% had someone living alone who was 65 years of age or older. The average household size was 2.43 and the average family size was 2.97.

In the city, the population was spread out, with 25.9% under the age of 18, 8.8% from 18 to 24, 25.1% from 25 to 44, 20.5% from 45 to 64, and 19.7% who were 65 years of age or older. The median age was 38 years. For every 100 females, there were 87.7 males. For every 100 females age 18 and over, there were 83.8 males.

The median income for a household in the city was $28,861, and the median income for a family was $36,585. Males had a median income of $30,099 versus $19,122 for females. The per capita income for the city was $14,996. About 10.3% of families and 14.1% of the population were below the poverty line, including 17.3% of those under age 18 and 12.2% of those age 65 or over.

Historic Site

The Mullendore Mansion, a two-and-one-half-story Greek Revival structure built in 1910, is located at 910 N. Phillips St.

Parks and Recreation 
Cleveland is adjacent to Keystone Lake.

Cleveland City Lake is 7 miles W of town on US-64.

Cleveland City Parks and Recreation Department maintains three parks, with more than 50 picnic areas, 3 tennis courts, and 1 gymnasium.

Notable people
 David Bivin - author
 Tony Perkins - president of the Family Research Council and a former Republican member of the Louisiana House of Representatives graduated from Cleveland High School in 1981.
 Billy Vessels was born in Cleveland in 1931 and played football for the Tigers before graduating and becoming a star back at the University of Oklahoma. He was the 1952 Heisman Trophy winner. He later went on to play in the NFL for the Baltimore Colts, only playing 2 seasons. He suffered a knee injury during his second year forcing him to retire early and go home a hero.

References

External links
 Encyclopedia of Oklahoma History and Culture - Cleveland

Cities in Pawnee County, Oklahoma
Cities in Oklahoma
Tulsa metropolitan area
Populated places established in 1893
1893 establishments in Oklahoma Territory
Oklahoma populated places on the Arkansas River